The women's 4×100 metre freestyle relay event at the 1960 Olympic Games took place on September 2 and 3, in Rome.  This swimming event used freestyle as a relay, with swimmers typically using the front crawl. Because an Olympic size swimming pool is 50 metres long, each of the four swimmers completed two lengths of the pool. The first swimmer had to touch the wall before the second could leave the starting block; timing of the starts was thus important.

Medalists

* Swimmers who participated in the heats only.  Under 1960 Olympic rules, they did not receive a medal.

Results

Heats

Heat 1

Heat 2

Final

References

Swimming at the 1960 Summer Olympics
4 × 100 metre freestyle relay
1960 in women's swimming
Women's events at the 1960 Summer Olympics